Dinsmoor is a surname, and may refer to:

 Charles Dinsmoor (1834–1904), American inventor and lawyer
 James A Dinsmoor (1921-2005), a psychologist specialized in the field of experiential analysis of behavior
 Samuel Dinsmoor (1766–1835), American teacher, lawyer and politician
 Samuel Dinsmoor Jr. (1799–1869), American lawyer, banker and politician 
 Samuel P. Dinsmoor (1843–1932), American teacher and sculptor 
 Silas Dinsmoor (1766–1847), U. S. Agent to the Cherokee and Choctaw
 William Bell Dinsmoor (1886–1973), American architectural historian of classical Greece
 William Bell Dinsmoor Jr. (1923–1988), American classical archaeologist and architectural historian